Llewelyn E. Jones (born December 2, 1962) is a Republican member of the Montana Legislature. He was elected to Senate District 14, representing Conrad, Montana, for the 2011-2013 term. Previously Jones served 3 terms in the House of Representatives.  Jones holds an MS in Economics from Montana State University.

References

Living people
1962 births
Republican Party Montana state senators
Politicians from Helena, Montana
Republican Party members of the Montana House of Representatives
Montana State University alumni
People from Conrad, Montana
21st-century American politicians